Shal (Tati: , Čâl) is a city and capital of Shal District, in Buin Zahra County, Qazvin Province, Iran. At the 2006 census its population was 15,104, in 3,348 families. The language of the people in the Shal is Tati.

The 14th-century author Hamdallah Mustawfi listed Shal as one of the main villages in the territory of Qazvin.

Shal is historically known as a center of sheep breeding.

References 

Buin Zahra County
Cities in Qazvin Province